The 2014 Indian general election in Maharashtra was held in three phases on 10, 17 and 24 April 2014.

These were held for 48 seats with the state going to polls in the first three phases of the general elections. The major contenders in the state were the United Progressive Alliance (UPA) and National Democratic Alliance (NDA). UPA consisted of the Indian National Congress and the Nationalist Congress Party whereas the NDA consisted of the Bharatiya Janata Party and the Shiv Sena. The Shiv Sena contested on 20 seats in the state and the BJP over 24 seats. Similarly, the NCP contested on 21 seats and the Indian National Congress contested on 26 seats.

Results 

|- align=center
!style="background-color:#E9E9E9" class="unsortable"|
!style="background-color:#E9E9E9" align=center|Political Party
!style="background-color:#E9E9E9" |Seats contested
!style="background-color:#E9E9E9" |Seats won
!style="background-color:#E9E9E9" |Seat change
|-
| 
|align="left"|Bharatiya Janata Party||24||23|| 14
|-
| 
|align="left"|Shiv Sena||20||18|| 7
|-
| 
|align="left"|Nationalist Congress Party||21||4|| 4
|-
| 
|align="left"|Indian National Congress||26||2|| 16
|-
| 
|align="left"|Swabhimani Paksha||2||1||
|-
| 
|align="left"|Bahujan Vikas Aaghadi||1||0|| -1
|-
| 
|align="left"|Independent||||0||
|-
|
|align="left"|Total||||48||
|-
|}

Results Alliance-wise

List of Elected MPs

National Democratic Alliance(NDA)

United Progressive Alliance(UPA)

Western Maharashtra

Vidarbha

Marathwada

Thane+Konkan

Mumbai

North Maharashtra

List of all elected Bharatiya Janata Party MPs 

List of all elected Shiv Sena MPs:

List of all elected Nationalist Congress Party MPs

List of all elected Indian National Congress MPs

References

Indian general elections in Maharashtra
2010s in Maharashtra
2014 Indian general election by state or union territory
2014 in Maharashtra